MegaZone was an Australian video game magazine which ran from July 1988 to October 1995, ultimately publishing 56 issues. 

MegaZone started out as a bi-monthly, multi-platform magazine named MegaComp which was originally published by Elwood, Victoria–based MegaComp Publications. It later switched to a monthly format under the ownership of local software distributor Ozisoft (later Sega Ozisoft) and changed its name to MegaZone. In June 1993 the magazine switched its focus exclusively to Sega console software after being taken over by Mason Stewart Publishing. Later issues would be published under the name Sega MegaZone to denote its new focus. 

Although ostensibly multi-platform in coverage prior to its acquisition by Mason Stewart, Sega Ozisoft used the magazine to promote titles they distributed in Australia, which included Commodore 64, Amiga and PC titles alongside games on Sega platforms, but none on Nintendo platforms as they were distributed by rival Mattel in the country. During this period subscribers to the magazine were also given a 20-page insert called SegaZone dedicated to Sega games, which was published on a quarterly basis until its content was merged with the main magazine.

References

External links
MegaZone at SegaRetro.org
MegaZone at Australian Gaming Database
MegaZone Preservation Archive Project at Wordpress.com
MegaZone Archive at Archive.org

1988 establishments in Australia
1995 disestablishments in Australia
Bi-monthly magazines published in Australia
Computer magazines published in Australia
Defunct computer magazines
Defunct magazines published in Australia
Magazines established in 1988
Magazines disestablished in 1995
Mass media in Victoria (Australia)
Monthly magazines published in Australia
Video game magazines published in Australia
Sega magazines
Bandai Namco Holdings